Gabriel DeJesus Arias (born December 6, 1989) is a Dominican Republic professional baseball pitcher who is a free agent.

Career

Philadelphia Phillies
On July 24, 2007, Arias signed with the Philadelphia Phillies as an international free agent. He appeared in 4 games for the Dominican Summer League Phillies to begin his professional career. In 2008, Arias recorded a 2.63 ERA in 17 appearances for the DSL Phillies. He would improve with the team the following two years, posting ERAs of 2.29 (in 17 games) and 1.22 (in 14 games) respectively. Arias spent the 2011 season with the Low-A Williamsport Crosscutters, working to a 2.97 ERA with 31 strikeouts in 24 appearances. He split the 2012 season between the High-A Clearwater Threshers and the Single-A Lakewood BlueClaws, accumulating a 3.65 ERA with 106 strikeouts in 101.0 innings across 37 contests. Arias returned to Clearwater the following year, pitching to a 2.47 ERA in 12 games. On November 4, 2013, Arias elected free agency.

Cleveland Indians
On December 19, 2013, Arias signed a minor league contract with the Cleveland Indians. Arias spent 2014 split between the Triple-A Columbus Clippers and the Double-A Akron RubberDucks, posting a 14-6 record and 3.68 ERA in 27 games. He elected free agency on November 4, 2014.

Arizona Diamondbacks
On November 19, 2014, Arias signed a minor league contract with the Arizona Diamondbacks. In 2015, he played the season with the Triple-A Reno Aces and Double-A Mobile BayBears, accumulating an 11-6 record and 4.48 ERA with 85 strikeouts in 128.2 innings pitched across 24 contests (23 of them starts). On November 6, 2015, Arias elected free agency.

Washington Nationals
Arias did not play affiliated ball in 2016 and signed a minor league contract with the Washington Nationals on December 23, 2016. He spent the 2017 season with the Triple-A Syracuse Chiefs, but pitched in only 2 games due to injury. He elected free agency on November 6, 2017.

Algodoneros de Unión Laguna
On July 12, 2018, Arias signed with the Algodoneros de Unión Laguna of the Mexican League. Arias made 10 starts for the club down the stretch, but struggled to a 7.64 ERA in 55.1 innings of work.

Leones de Yucatán
On April 13, 2019, Arias signed with the Leones de Yucatán of the Mexican League. Arias tossed 6.0 innings of 7.50 ERA ball in 7 appearances before he was released on May 4.

Pericos de Puebla
On June 26, 2019, Arias signed with the Pericos de Puebla of the Mexican League. Arias recorded a 3.00 ERA in 12 appearances for the team in 2019. Arias did not play in a game in 2020 due to the cancellation of the Mexican League season because of the COVID-19 pandemic. Arias re-signed with the team on June 10, 2021, and pitched in only 3 games due to a shoulder injury, striking out 10 and allowing 4 earned runs in 11.2 innings of work. On October 20, 2021, Arias was released by Puebla.

International career
Arias replaced Diego Goris on the Dominican Republic national baseball team for the 2020 Summer Olympics, contested in July 2021, after Goris tested positive for cannabis.

References

External links

Living people
1989 births
Dominican Republic baseball players
Baseball players at the 2020 Summer Olympics
Dominican Summer League Phillies players
Williamsport Crosscutters players
Lakewood BlueClaws players
Clearwater Threshers players
Akron RubberDucks players
Columbus Clippers players
Tigres del Licey players
Águilas del Zulia players
Mobile BayBears players
Reno Aces players
Syracuse Chiefs players
Algodoneros de Unión Laguna players
Leones de Yucatán players
Pericos de Puebla players
Olympic baseball players of the Dominican Republic
Medalists at the 2020 Summer Olympics
Olympic medalists in baseball
Olympic bronze medalists for the Dominican Republic
People from Santiago Province (Dominican Republic)